The following highways are numbered 3, H-3, PRI-3, AH3, E03 and R3. For roads numbered A3, see A3 roads. For roads numbered M3, see M3. For roads numbered N3, see N3. For roads numbered 3A, see 3A.

International 
 Asian Highway 3
 European route E03
 European route E003
 Tripoli – Cape Town Highway

Albania
 A3 motorway (Albania)
 SH-3 Road in Albania from Kapshtice to Tirana.

Argentina
 National Route 3

Australia

New South Wales 
 A3 (Sydney)

Northern Territory 
 (Northern Territory)

Queensland 
 M3/A3 (Brisbane)
 Burnett Highway (Queensland)
 State Route 3 (Queensland) – Isis Highway

South Australia 
 Cross Road

Tasmania 
 Tasman Highway

Victoria 
 
Eastern Freeway (Melbourne)
EastLink (Melbourne) (Toll)
Frankston Freeway

Western Australia 
 State Route 3 (Western Australia) – Reid Highway and Roe Highway

Decommissioned Routes 

  Metropolitan Route 3 (Victoria) – Nepean Highway and St Kilda Road - Replaced by

Austria 
 Südost Autobahn

Belgium 
 R3 (ring road)

Bulgaria
 Републикански път I-3
 Struma motorway (A3/E79)

Burma
National Highway 3 (Burma)

Cambodia
National Highway 3 (Cambodia)

Canada 
 Alberta Highway 3 (Crowsnest Highway)
 British Columbia Highway 3 (Crowsnest Highway)
 Manitoba Highway 3
 New Brunswick Route 3
 Newfoundland and Labrador Route 3
 Nova Scotia Trunk 3
 Ontario Highway 3
 Prince Edward Island Route 3
 Quebec Route 3 (former)
 Saskatchewan Highway 3
 Yellowknife Highway (Northwest Territories Highway 3)
 Yukon Highway 3

China 
  G3 Expressway

Costa Rica
 National Route 3

Czech Republic
 D3 motorway
 I/3 Highway (in Czech)

Djibouti
  RN-3 (Djibouti)

Dominican Republic
  DR-3

Eswatini
MR3 road

Finland
 Finnish national road 3
 Åland Islands Highway 3

Germany 
  Bundesautobahn 3
  Bundesstraße 3

Hong Kong 
 Route 3 (Hong Kong)

Hungary 
 M3 motorway (Hungary)
 Main road 3 (Hungary)

India 
  National Highway 3 (India)
 National Highway 3 (India, old numbering)

Indonesia
 Indonesian National Route 3

Iran

 Freeway 3 (Iran)

Iraq
 Highway 3 (Iraq)

Ireland
 M3 motorway (Republic of Ireland)
 N3 road (Ireland)

Israel 
 Highway 3 (Israel)

Italy
 Autostrada A3
 RA 3

Japan 

 (branch of the Kyushu Expressway)
 Route 3 (Shuto Expressway) in the Shibuya area of Tokyo
 Route 3 (Nagoya Expressway)
 Kobe Route

Kazakhstan 
A3 highway (Kazakhstan)

Korea, South 
 National Route 3

Laos
R3A highway

Malaysia 
  Second Link Expressway
  Malaysia Federal Route 3

Mexico
 Mexican Federal Highway 3

Moldova
 Magistrala 3
 Road 3

New Zealand
 New Zealand State Highway 3
 New Zealand State Highway 3A

Paraguay
 National Route 3

Philippines
 Circumferential Road 3
 Radial Road 3
 N3 highway (Philippines)
 E3 expressway (Philippines)

Poland 
  Autostrada A3 (planned 1993-2001; unbuilt)
  Expressway S3
  National road 3

Romania
 Drumul Naţional 3
 Autostrada A3

Russia
 M3 highway (Russia)

Sri Lanka

 Colombo-Puttalam Road
 Colombo–Katunayake Expressway

Taiwan (Republic of China) 
 Freeway 3 (Taiwan)
 Provincial Highway 3 (Taiwan)

Thailand
 Thailand Route 3 (Sukhumvit Road)

Turkey
  , a motorway in Turkey running from Edirne to Istanbul.

United Kingdom
 M3 motorway (Great Britain)
 A3 road (Great Britain)
 M3 motorway (Northern Ireland)
 A3 road (Northern Ireland)

United States
 Interstate 3 (proposed)
 Interstate A-3 (unsigned)
 Interstate H-3
 Interstate PR-3 (unsigned)
 U.S. Route 3
 New England Interstate Route 3 (former)
 Alabama State Route 3
 Alaska Route 3
 Arkansas Highway 3
 California State Route 3
 Colorado State Highway 3
 Connecticut Route 3
 Delaware Route 3
 Florida State Road 3
 Florida State Road 3A (pre-1945) (former)
 County Road 3 (Brevard County, Florida)
 County Road 3 (Volusia County, Florida)
 Georgia State Route 3
 Georgia State Route 3N (former)
 Georgia State Route 3S (Thomaston) (former)
 Georgia State Route 3W (Albany 1946–1957) (former)
 Georgia State Route 3W (Albany 1960–1973) (former)
 Georgia State Route 3W (Thomaston) (former)
 Georgia State Route 3W (Atlanta–Marietta 1937–1946) (former)
 Georgia State Route 3W (Atlanta–Marietta 1954–1955) (former)
 Georgia State Route 3E (Thomaston) (former)
 Georgia State Route 3E (Atlanta–Marietta) (former)
 Idaho State Highway 3
 Illinois Route 3
 Indiana State Road 3
 Iowa Highway 3
 K-3 (Kansas highway)
 Kentucky Route 3
 Louisiana Highway 3
 Louisiana State Route 3 (former)
 Maine State Route 3
 Maryland Route 3
 Massachusetts Route 3
 M-3 (Michigan highway)
 Minnesota State Highway 3
 County Road 3 (Anoka County, Minnesota)
 County Road 3 (Chisago County, Minnesota)
 County Road 3 (Goodhue County, Minnesota)
 County Road 3 (Hennepin County, Minnesota)
 County Road 3 (Ramsey County, Minnesota)
 County Road 3 (St. Louis County, Minnesota)
 Mississippi Highway 3
 Missouri Route 3
 Missouri Route 3 (1922) (former)
 Montana Highway 3
 Nebraska Highway 3 (former)
 Nevada State Route 3 (former)
 New Jersey Route 3
 County Route 3 (Monmouth County, New Jersey)
 County Route 3A (Monmouth County, New Jersey)
 County Route 3 (Ocean County, New Jersey)
 New York State Route 3
 New York State Route 3A (1930–1932) (former)
 New York State Route 3A (1932–1935) (former)
 New York State Route 3B (1930–1932) (former)
 New York State Route 3B (1932–1935) (former)
 New York State Route 3C (1930–1932) (former)
 New York State Route 3C (1932–1935) (former)
 New York State Route 3D (1931–1932) (former)
 New York State Route 3D (1932–1935) (former)
 New York State Route 3E (1930–1932) (former)
 New York State Route 3E (1932–1935) (former)
 New York State Route 3F (1931–1932) (former)
 New York State Route 3F (1932–1935) (former)
 New York State Route 3G (former)
 County Route 3 (Allegany County, New York)
 County Route 3 (Cattaraugus County, New York)
 County Route 3 (Chemung County, New York)
 County Route 3 (Dutchess County, New York)
 County Route 3 (Genesee County, New York)
 County Route 3 (Greene County, New York)
 County Route 3 (Jefferson County, New York)
 County Route 3 (Livingston County, New York)
 County Route 3 (Montgomery County, New York)
 County Route 3 (Niagara County, New York)
 County Route 3 (Oneida County, New York)
 County Route 3 (Ontario County, New York)
 County Route 3 (Oswego County, New York)
 County Route 3 (Otsego County, New York)
 County Route 3 (Rensselaer County, New York)
 County Route 3 (Schoharie County, New York)
 County Route 3 (Schuyler County, New York)
 County Route 3 (St. Lawrence County, New York)
 County Route 3 (Steuben County, New York)
 County Route 3 (Suffolk County, New York)
 County Route 3 (Westchester County, New York)
 North Carolina Highway 3
 North Dakota Highway 3
 Ohio State Route 3
 Oklahoma State Highway 3
 Oklahoma State Highway 3E
 Oklahoma State Highway 3W
 Oregon Route 3
 Pennsylvania Route 3
 Rhode Island Route 3
 South Carolina Highway 3
 Tennessee State Route 3
 Texas State Highway 3
 Texas State Highway Loop 3 (former)
 Texas State Highway Spur 3
 Texas Farm to Market Road 3
 Texas Park Road 3
 Utah State Route 3 (former)
 Vermont Route 3
 Virginia State Route 3
 Washington State Route 3
 Primary State Highway 3 (Washington) (former)
 West Virginia Route 3

Territories
 Guam Highway 3
 Interstate PR-3 (unsigned)
 Puerto Rico Highway 3
 Puerto Rico Highway 3R

Uruguay
 Route 3 Gral. José Artigas

See also

References